Brian Joseph O'Shaughnessy (10 September 1925 – 7 July 2010) was an Australian philosopher of mind, who lived in London and taught at King's College London. He published papers on the nature  of physical action and the will, at a time when this was quite unfashionable.

Biography
He was born in Kew, a suburb of Melbourne in Australia, where his father was a doctor. He studied at Xavier College and then attended Melbourne University, firstly studying engineering before changing to philosophy. He graduated in 1950 and then went to England to continue his studies at Oxford University. He is buried in Highgate Cemetery in north London in the first section on the right immediately upon entering the Eastern Cemetery. His wife Edna O'Shaughnessy was buried with him in 2022.

Major works
 The Will: A Dual Aspect Theory (1980) Cambridge University Press  
 Consciousness and the World (2000, Oxford University Press)

References

Alumni of the University of Oxford
University of Melbourne alumni
Australian philosophers
Academics of King's College London
Australian people of Irish descent
1925 births
2010 deaths
Burials at Highgate Cemetery
Place of death missing
Australian expatriates in the United Kingdom
People from Kew, Victoria
Academics from Melbourne
People educated at Xavier College